SuperPower is a 2002 political simulation computer game. SuperPower was designed by GolemLabs and published by DreamCatcher Interactive, debuting on March 28, 2002 for Microsoft Windows. SuperPower 2 was released in 2004. SuperPower 3 was released in 2022.

Gameplay
The start of play is set during the first week of January 1997, with the player assuming the role of the newly appointed leader of one of 140 controllable nations. Players are given complete command over their nation from the use of thermonuclear weapons, to the level of taxes, to what kind of government is in control, to sending secret service operatives to conduct covert missions. SuperPower has two different game modes; scenarios and freeplay.

Scenarios
Superpower has some premade scenarios that offer a challenge in the way you have to solve a problem. The main factor that makes the scenarios difficult is that they restrict what kind of actions you can take (Ex: not being able to use military action)

Scenarios
 Argentina - Protect Bolivia from invasion
 Côte d'Ivoire - Reclaim control over territory
 United States - Restore democracy in Haiti
 South Korea - Sign an alliance with North Korea
 United Kingdom - Create anarchy in Poland
 Russia - Rebuilding the communist superpower
 China - Sign a strategic alliance with Taiwan

Freeplay
Freeplay is a sandbox mode, beginning with the choices of which nation to control, which objectives to complete and a time limit to complete them within. Play continues until the objectives are completed or the time limit expires. Freeplay can be played for one in-game year, five years, ten years, or for an unlimited amount of time. The mandatory objective is to stay in power, optional objectives include conquering the world, eliminating armed rebels, or balancing the nation's resources. The game can be set to play with the one mandatory objective, staying in power, and the unlimited time period for an objective free game.

Reception

The game received "unfavorable" reviews according to the review aggregation website Metacritic. It has been heavily criticized for its many bugs, including some that do not allow the player to complete the game in the amount of time listed, the game often crashing back to the desktop even when all the computer requirements have been met, and the country's budget suddenly crashing.

See also
SuperPower 2

References

External links

2002 video games
DreamCatcher Interactive games
Government simulation video games
Video games developed in Canada
Windows games
Windows-only games
Grand strategy video games